Ernst Gröschel (18 December 1918 in Nuremberg – 5 May 2000 in Zams, Tirol) was a German pianist. Gröschel studied with Emil von Sauer and others in Vienna. He is regarded as the first pianist who played Mozart and Beethoven completely on historical keyboard instruments. He was a member of the Bamberg Piano Quartet. He left behind a large number of recordings both on vinyl and in the archives of the Bayerischer Rundfunk.

Publications 
 Ernst Gröschel auf einem historischen Hammerflügel - Bach, Johann Sebastian. - S.l.: Colosseum-Schallplatten, 1973
 Mozart auf dem Hammerklavier. Menuett und Trio G-Dur KV1 - Mozart, Wolfgang Amadeus. - S.l.: Colosseum-Schallplatten, 1973
 Konzerte, Kl Orch Klavierkonzerte Tonträger - Beethoven, Ludwig van. - Merenberg: Zyx Music, P 2008
 Trios, Vl Vc Kl (1997) Trio für Klavier, Violine und Violoncello - Klepper, Wilhelm. - Bamberg: Egino Klepper, 2000
 Oktette, MWV R 20 Streichoktett E-Dur op. 20 - Mendelssohn Bartholdy, Felix. - Hamburg: Line Music, 2000

Further reading 
 Bayerische Akademie der Schönen Künste (ed.): Laudatio auf Ernst Gröschel. In Jahrbuch, Band 9. Beck, Munich 1995, S. 468 ff.
 Gröschel, Ernst, jun. In Kürschners deutscher Musiker-Kalender. De Gruyter, Berlin 1954.

References

External links 
 
 

German classical pianists
1918 births
2000 deaths
Musicians from Nuremberg
German expatriates in Austria